Kenkey (also known as kɔmi, otim, kooboo or dorkunu) is a staple swallow food similar to sourdough dumplings from the Ga and Fante-inhabited regions of West Africa, usually served with pepper crudaiola and fried fish, soup or stew.

Description
Kenkey is produced by steeping grains of maize in water for about one week, before they are then milled and kneaded with water into a dough. The dough is allowed to ferment for four days to a week before part of the dough is cooked.

Variations 
Areas where kenkey is eaten are Ghana, eastern Côte d'Ivoire, Togo, western Benin, Guyana, and Jamaica. It is usually made from ground corn (maize), like sadza and ugali. It is popularly known as kɔmi (pronounced kormi) by the Gas or dokono by the Akans in Ghana. It is also known in Jamaica as dokunoo, dokono, dokunu, blue drawers, and tie-a-leaf. In Mexico, there is a version called "Tamale". Kenkey can also be found in an area of Northern Ghana whose capital is called Tamale. In Guyana, it is called konkee. In Trinidad it is called "paime" (pronounced pay-me) and differs in that it does not contain plantain but may include pumpkin and coconut. In the cuisine of the Caribbean, it is made with cornmeal, plantain, green banana, sweet potato (Asante and Jamaican version, which came from the Asante version) or cassava, wrapped in banana leaves. The food is derived from African cooking traditions.

Unlike ugali, making kenkey involves letting the maize ferment before cooking. Therefore, preparation takes a few days in order to let the dough ferment. Corn meal is mixed with cornstarch and water is added until a smooth and consistent dough is obtained. It is covered and left in a warm place for the fermentation to take place. After fermentation, the kenkey is partially cooked, wrapped in banana leaves, corn husks, or foil, and steamed. There are several versions of kenkey, such as Ga and Fante kenkey. The Ga kenkey is more common in most parts of Ghana.

Ice kenkey is a meal made from kenkey mixed with water, sugar, powdered milk, and ice.

Gallery

See also 

Cuisine of Ghana
Cuisine of Jamaica
List of African dishes
List of dumplings
Tamale
Ice kenkey

References

External links 

 Phil Bartle, "Kwasi Bruni; Corn and the Europeans", VCN.org.
 "West Africa Recipe - Cooking Kenkey" . West Africa Secondary School, Accra, Ghana. PBS Kids.
 "Questions and Answers > Food products > What is kenkey and how is it made?". Food-info.net. Wageningen University, The Netherlands.
 Fran Osseo-Asare (March 28, 2007). "Ghana-style Kenkey". Betumi.com.
"Studies on kenkey : a food product made from corn in Ghana"
 "Paime: a traditional dessert", Daily Express (Trinidad & Tobago), 3 September 2010.
Acceleration of the fermentation of kenkey, an indigenous fermented maize food of Ghana.
Microbiological and Aromatic Characteristics of Fermented Maize Doughs for Kenkey Production in Ghana.
Nutrient Content and Survival of Selected Pathogenic Bacteria in Kenkey Used as a Weaning Food in Ghana.

Ghanaian cuisine
Ivorian cuisine
Beninese cuisine
Togolese cuisine
Jamaican cuisine
Trinidad and Tobago cuisine
Guyanese cuisine
Dumplings
Swallows (food)
Fermented foods
Caribbean cuisine
Maize dishes